Mallowa is a small locality in Moree Plains Shire, in northern New South Wales, Australia. It lies about 70 km southwest of Moree and 643 km northwest of Sydney.

References

Moree Plains Shire
North West Slopes
Localities in New South Wales